Adoration of the Shepherds with a Donor is a c.1520-1525 oil on canvas painting by Palma Vecchio, now in room 711 of the Louvre in Paris.

Its original location and the identity of its commissioner (shown kneeling to the right) are both unknown, though it was recorded as being owned in 1669 by Abraham Nicolas Amelot de la Houssaye, secretary to the French ambassador to Venice in the second half of the 17th century. It was next owned by the painter Antoine Benoist, who misattributed it to Titian. It was then acquired from him in 1685 by Louis XIV of France and kept at the Palace of Versailles before being seized upon the French Revolution.

References

Bibliography
 Giovanni Mariacher, 'Palma il Vecchio', in I pittori bergamaschi-Il Cinquecento, I, Bergamo, Poligrafiche Bolis, 1975, p. 212.

Paintings by Palma Vecchio
Palma
1525 paintings
Paintings in the Louvre by Italian artists